Leopold Z. Goldstein (1899-1963), an American physician and endocrinologist, was born in Camden, New Jersey, graduated from Camden High School and the University of Pennsylvania Medical School in 1922. He continued a path in medicine initiated by his older brother, Hyman I Goldstein. His younger brother, Henry Z. Goldstein  specializing in otolaryngology, also a graduate of the University of Pennsylvania completed the brothers' careers in medicine. Goldstein died in Paris in 1963.

He was chief of  gynecology and obstetrics at Einstein Medical Center, Associate Professor at Thomas Jefferson University Medical Center, and an associate of the Gynecology Department of the University of Pennsylvania, all of Philadelphia, PA. During the late 1920s, Goldstein undertook postgraduate studies in Vienna, Austria, and the Rotunda Hospital in Dublin.

He co-authored, "Clinical Endocrinology of the Female" with Charles Mazer, published in Philadelphia and London by W.B. Saunders Company, 1932. He also was the author of over forty articles in his specialty published in respective medical journals during his career, and was a proponent of the use of the Colposcopy in physical examinations of female patients.

References
University of Pennsylvania Alumni Records, Medical, Class of 1922.
"Philadelphia Inquirer," obituary, August 10, 1963.
 Articles appeared in "Obstetrics and Gynecology," "The American Journal of Hygiene," "Archives of Neurology and Psychiatry," "Journal of the American Medical Association," "Medical World," "International Clinicials," "British Medical Journal," and other medical journals.

External links
Biography of Dr. Leopold Z. Goldstein

1899 births
1963 deaths
American endocrinologists
Perelman School of Medicine at the University of Pennsylvania alumni
Thomas Jefferson University faculty
American Jews
American people of Ukrainian-Jewish descent